Providence Zen Center (PZC) is the Head Temple of the Americas for the Kwan Um School of Zen (KUSZ) and the first Zen center established by Seungsahn in the United States in October 1972. The PZC offers residential training where students and teachers live together under one roof, which was one of the hallmarks of Seung Sahn's philosophy concerning Zen practice in his organization. Practice at the center, and at Diamond Hill Zen Monastery, which shares the PZC property, includes sitting meditation, prostrations, and chanting.

The Providence Zen Center was originally located in Providence, Rhode Island, but in 1979 the center relocated to its current 50-acre site in Cumberland. PZC also serves as the U.S. headquarters for the Jogye Order of Korean Buddhism.

History

The Providence Zen Center was established by Seung Sahn in October 1972 on Doyle Avenue in Providence, Rhode Island as the first practice center for his American students. The center came to be after Brown University professor Leo Pruden had invited Seung Sahn to give talks on Buddhism at the university, with several of the students thereafter coming to him for teachings. After relocating in 1974 to 48 Hope Street, the PZC came into possession of a  plot of land in 1978 located in Cumberland, Rhode Island.

During the 1980s the PZC became a catalyst for opening the dialogue on the role of women in Zen Buddhism, becoming host to various discussion panels and conferences on feminist issues in the years to follow. In 1982 the center organized a discussion group for woman at the center. Then in 1983 the PZC offered a workshop called "Feminist Principles in Zen," led by Barbara Rhodes, Maurine Stuart, Jacqueline Schwartz and Susan Murcott. In 1984 and 1985 the center held "Women in American Buddhism" conferences and, according to the book The Encyclopedia of Women and Religion in North America, "[f]rom then on women's retreats and conferences became common."

From 1983—1984 the Kwan Um School of Zen constructed Diamond Hill Zen Monastery on the grounds of PZC, a "low, pagoda shaped building" built in the "traditional Korean-style [of] architecture", which today hosts their semi-annual Kyol Che retreats. Originally designed as a training ground for those who were ordained, Seung Sahn expressed little interest in the training there. According to a longtime student of the Kwan Um School Mu Soeng, "[Seung Sahn] did not even insist that all his ordained American students make the monastery their home and contribute to its growth as a monastic center. To this day, the Diamond Hill Zen Monastery remains a minor footnote to Seung Sahn's missionary activities in America."

Kyol Che 
Providence Zen Center annually holds a three-month Winter Kyol Che meditation retreat and a four-week Summer Kyol Che meditation retreat. The retreats are held at the Diamond Hill Zen Monastery.

See also

Cambridge Zen Center
Musangsa
Chogye International Zen Center
Timeline of Zen Buddhism in the United States

Gallery

Notes

References

External links

Buddhism in the United States
Buddhist temples in the United States
Buildings and structures in Cumberland, Rhode Island
Education in Providence County, Rhode Island
Kwan Um School of Zen
Landmarks in Rhode Island
Buddhism in Rhode Island
Zen centers in the United States
Religious buildings and structures in Rhode Island